The Woman from Hell newly renamed as The Woman from Luna was a 1929 American silent film drama produced and distributed by Fox Film Corporation and starring Mary Astor. This film had a Movietone sound track of music and effects. This was Dean Jagger's film debut. it is considered to be Lost.

Plot 
Dee Renaud is a girl playing the "Devil" in an amusement concession at a beach resort. Slick Glicks, the barker, promises the yokels that if they're able to catch the "Lady From Hell," she will reward them with a kiss. But when Glicks tries to go beyond kissing, Dee is rescued by Jim Coakley, son of a New England lighthouse keeper. She marries him out of gratitude and they move to his home on an island off the rockbound coast. Dee tries to convince Jim's salty old father, Pat, that she'll be a good and faithful wife. But she's a passionate woman with a bit of the devil in her, and she flirts with Jim's best friend Alf, who invites her to elope to Havana with him. When Pat is incapacitated, however, Dee loyally remains in the lighthouse to operate the beam and avert a shipwreck.

Cast
Mary Astor - Dee Renaud
Robert Armstrong - Alf
Dean Jagger - Jim Coakley
Roy D'Arcy - 'Slick' Glicks
May Boley - Mother Price
James Bradbury Sr. - Pat 
Billy Gilbert

See also
1937 Fox vault fire

References

External links

THE WOMAN FROM HELL; lobby poster

1929 films
American silent feature films
Lost American films
Fox Film films
1929 drama films
Silent American drama films
American black-and-white films
1929 lost films
Lost drama films
1920s American films